Paraprevotella is a Gram-negative, non-spore-forming, pleomorphic and anaerobic genus of bacteria from the family of Prevotellaceae. Paraprevotella clara and Paraprevotella xylaniphila have been isolated from human faeces.

References

Bacteria genera
Taxa described in 2009